Hambergen is a Samtgemeinde ("collective municipality") in the district of Osterholz, in Lower Saxony, Germany. Its seat is in the village Hambergen.

The Samtgemeinde Hambergen consists of the following municipalities:

 Axstedt 
 Hambergen
 Holste 
 Lübberstedt 
 Vollersode

Samtgemeinden in Lower Saxony